The Blessed Sacrament, also Most Blessed Sacrament, is a devotional name to refer to the body and blood of Christ in the form of consecrated sacramental bread and wine at a celebration of the Eucharist. The term is used in the Latin Church of the Catholic Church, as well as in Anglicanism, Lutheranism, Methodism, and the Old Catholic Church, as well as in some of the Eastern Catholic Churches. In the Byzantine Rite, the terms Holy Gifts and Divine Mysteries are used to refer to the consecrated elements. Christians in these traditions believe in the Real Presence of Jesus Christ in the Eucharistic elements of the bread and wine and some of them, therefore, practice Eucharistic reservation and adoration. This belief is based on interpretations of both sacred scripture and sacred tradition. The Catholic belief has been defined by numerous ecumenical councils, including the Fourth Lateran Council and the Council of Trent, which is quoted in the Catechism of the Catholic Church (which explains the meaning of transubstantiation).

The largest Portuguese feast in the world is held in New Bedford, Massachusetts in honor of the Blessed Sacrament attracting over 100,000 visitors each year.

Catholic Church

The Blessed Sacrament may be received by Catholics who have undergone First Holy Communion as part of the Liturgy of the Eucharist during Mass. The Catholic Church teaches that the soul of the person receiving the Eucharist must be in a "state of grace" (i.e., not be in a state of mortal sin) at the time of reception; since receiving the Eucharist in a state of mortal sin is to commit sacrilege. The Church teaches that those who are in a state of mortal sin must make confession and receive sacramental absolution of their mortal sins before receiving Holy Communion. 

The Blessed Sacrament can also be exposed (displayed) on an altar in a monstrance. Rites involving the exposure of the Blessed Sacrament include Benediction and eucharistic adoration. According to Catholic theology, the host, after the Rite of Consecration, is no longer bread, but is the Body, Blood, Soul, and Divinity of Christ. Catholics believe that Jesus is the sacrificial Lamb of God prefigured in the Old Testament Passover. Unless the flesh of that Passover sacrificial lamb was consumed, the members of the household would not be saved from death. As the Passover was the Old Covenant, so the Eucharist became the New Covenant. (Matthew 26:26–28, Mark 14:22-24, Luke 22: 19–20, and John 6:48–58)

Anglicanism

Reception of the Blessed Sacrament in the Anglican Communion and other Anglican jurisdictions varies by province. Formerly, Confirmation was generally required as a precondition to reception, but many provinces now allow all the baptised to partake as long as they are in good standing with the Church and have previously received First Communion.

Devotions to the Blessed Sacrament vary. Individuals will genuflect or bow in the presence of the Blessed Sacrament, which may be reserved in a tabernacle or aumbry on, behind, or near the altar. Its presence is usually indicated by a lamp suspended over or placed near the tabernacle or aumbry. Except among Anglo-Catholics, the use of a monstrance is rare. This is in keeping with the Article XXV of the Thirty-Nine Articles that "the Sacraments were not ordained of Christ to be gazed upon, or to be carried about, but that we should duly use Them." Nonetheless, many parishes do have services of devotions to the Blessed Sacrament, in which a ciborium is removed from the tabernacle or aumbry and hymns, prayers, psalms, and sentences of devotion are sung or read. In some parishes, when the Blessed Sacrament is moved from the tabernacle (from a high altar to a chapel altar, for instance), sanctus bells are rung and all who are present kneel.

Lutheranism

In most Lutheran churches, a person must have had catechetical training prior to a First Communion (or have received Confirmation in the Lutheran Church) to receive the Eucharist. Recently, more liberal churches allow all who are baptized to receive it. Similar to the Anglican teaching,

Methodism

The Doctrines and Discipline of the Methodist Church specifies, on days during which Holy Communion is celebrated, that "Upon entering the church let the communicants bow in prayer and in the spirit of prayer and meditation approach the Blessed Sacrament."

With respect to Methodist Eucharistic theology, the Catechism for the use of the people called Methodists states that, "[in the Eucharist] Jesus Christ is present with his worshipping people and gives himself to them as their Lord and Saviour". Methodist theology of this sacrament is reflected in a Eucharistic hymn written by one of the fathers of the movement, Charles Wesley:
We need not now go up to Heaven,
To bring the long sought Saviour down;
Thou art to all already given,
Thou dost e’en now Thy banquet crown:
To every faithful soul appear,
And show Thy real presence here!
Methodists practice an Open Table, in which all baptised Christians are invited to receive Holy Communion.

See also
Eucharist
Eucharist in the Catholic Church

Further reading

References

Works cited

External links
Newadvent.org, "The Blessed Eucharist as a Sacrament". Article from the Catholic Encyclopedia
Savior.org - Live Video Stream of the Blessed Sacrament
Paragraph 1376 of the Catechism of the Catholic Church
EWTN - The Holy Eucharist - Easy yet comprehensive website with Catholic Teaching on the Eucharist
PortugueseFeast.com  New Bedford's Feast of the Blessed Sacrament
Melkite Greek Catholic Rite of Benediction

Eucharist in the Catholic Church
Anglican Eucharistic theology
Lutheran Eucharistic theology
Anglican sacraments
Christian terminology